Holger Petersen,  (born 23 November 1949) is a Canadian businessman, record producer and radio broadcaster. He founded the independent roots music record label Stony Plain Records in 1975 with partner Alvin Jahns.  The label was sold to True North/Linus Music in 2018, but Petersen continues to act as executive producer on many recording projects. He was born in Pellworm Island, West Germany.

Petersen has hosted Saturday Night Blues since 1987, heard on CBC Radio (at various times on CBC Radio One, CBC Radio Two, CBC Music, CBC Listen and SiriusXM 169) and Natch'l Blues since 1969, the longest running blues program in Canada, on the CKUA Radio Network. Petersen was a founder of the Edmonton Folk Music Festival and served as the artistic director from 1986 to 1988.  He has served on boards of numerous industry organizations, including SOCAN, CMRRA, CARAS and CIRPA and helped found the Alberta Recording Industries Association (now Alberta Music).

His first book, Talking Music: Blues Radio and Roots Music, was published in 2011 by Insomniac Press. His second book, Talking Music 2: Blues and Roots Music Mavericks, was released in January 2017.

He has also been a drummer and was a member of Spiny Norman's Whoopee Band and Hot Cottage.

Petersen was inducted as a Member into the Order of Canada in 2003 for contributions to Canadian culture, and has received honorary doctorates from both the University of Alberta and Athabasca University. He was appointed as a Member to the Alberta Order of Excellence in 2020.

Petersen has contributed to more than 180 music projects since 1970.

Petersen is based in Edmonton, Alberta.

Awards

References

External links
 Stony Plain Records
 CKUA Natch'l Blues
 CBC Radio Saturday Night Blues
 
 
  Entry for Stony Plain Records
 Entry at thecanadianencyclopedia.ca
 Entry at thecanadianencyclopedia.ca for Stony Plain Records

Canadian record producers
Businesspeople from Edmonton
Members of the Order of Canada
Members of the Alberta Order of Excellence
Petersen, Holger
Living people
CBC Radio hosts
1949 births